José Ballivián is a province of the Beni Department in northern Bolivia. It is named for José Ballivián, a general and former president of Bolivia who lived from 1805 until 1852. The province has a north-south extent. To the west the province is bounded by the Beni River (with the La Paz Department on the west (left) bank), to the east it borders on the Yacuma Province of the Beni Department.

The capital of the José Ballivián is Reyes (Reyes, Bolivia). Other towns in the province are San Borja, Rurrenabaque and Santa Rosa.

The province is sparsely populated.

Using Rurrenabaque as the starting point the pampas east of Reyes (Reyes, Bolivia) with its rich wildlife is a popular destination.

Rurrenabaque is also the point of access to the 'jungle', la 'selva', that is the rain forest west and south of Rurrenabaque, with the Madidi National Park known for its great biodiversity.

But the name of the José Ballivián Province is probably only known by very few of the tourists visiting the area, and very likely the same applies to the knowledge that crossing the Beni River means going from the Beni Department to the La Paz Department of Bolivia.

Places of interest 
 Beni Biological Station Biosphere Reserve
 Pilón Lajas Biosphere Reserve and Communal Lands

References

Provinces of Beni Department